Philpot may refer to:

Places 
 Philpot, Kentucky
 Philpot Lane, a short street in London

People 
 Andy Philpot, American actor and voice actor
 Asta Philpot (born 1982), protagonist of documentary film For one night only
 Benjamin Philpot (1790–1889), Archdeacon of Man
 Cory Philpot (born 1970), running back
 Elizabeth Philpot (1780–1857)
 Glyn Philpot (1884–1937), English painter and sculptor
 Jamie Philpot (born 1996), English footballer
 John Philpot (1516–1555), Archdeacon of Winchester and martyr
 Lawrence Philpot, American DJ
 Morgan Philpot (born 1971), politician
 Oliver Philpot (1913–1993), Canadian-born Royal Air Force pilot and businessman
 Robin Philpot (born 1948), Quebec journalist and electoral candidate
 Rufus Philpot (born 1968), British musician, former bassist of American progressive metal band Planet X
 Timothy N. Philpot (born 1951), American lawyer, author, and judge

See also
 Phillpott (disambiguation)
 Phillpotts, surname
 Philpott (disambiguation)
 Philpots Island